Paraíso is a district of the Paraíso canton, in the Cartago province of Costa Rica.

History 
It was established in 1823.

Geography 
Paraíso has an area of  km² and an elevation of  metres. It is located 8 km southeast of Cartago.

Demographics 

As of the 2011 census, Paraíso has a population of  inhabitants.

Transportation

Road transportation 
The district is covered by the following road routes:
 National Route 10
 National Route 224
 National Route 404
 National Route 416

Points of interest
Farmer's Market in the center of town
Finca la Flor de Paraiso (a non-profit organic farm)

Sister cities
Paraíso has one sister city:
  Coral Springs, Florida, United States

References 

Districts of Cartago Province
Populated places in Cartago Province
Populated places established in 1823